Gary Fleming (born 17 February 1967) is a retired footballer from Derry, Northern Ireland. He played for Nottingham Forest, Manchester City and Barnsley before retiring aged 30 due to injury. Following his retirement, he became a physiotherapist for Forest and later opened his own private practice.

Career

He started his career as a youth at Tristar Boys F.C. and later signed for Derry Athletic under the tutelage of coach Jim O'Hea with whom he went to Limavady United. There, he caught the eye of Nottingham Forest and in 1983 he signed a contract with them. His début was against Arsenal on 13 April 1985. He was sold to Manchester City in 1989 for a fee of £150,000, but spent only one year there before he was sold to Barnsley for £85,000.

He played 31 times for Northern Ireland between 1986 and 1994, with his last game coming against Austria. His career ended at the age of 30 due to an injury to his anterior cruciate ligament.

Physiotherapist

Following his retirement, he became a physiotherapist and worked as Forest's physio for ten years until 2007. During his spell at Forest, he studied at the University of Nottingham and graduated with a BSc (Hons).

Currently, he runs his own private practice, called The Gary Fleming Practice, which opened in 2009 with centres in Nottingham and Harrogate. Fleming is one of 15 specialists in the UK to practice the Intramuscular Stimulation method.

References

External links

Nottingham Forest page on sporting-heroes.net
Manchester City page on sporting-heroes.net
International page on sporting-heroes.net
Player profile on bridportred.co.uk

1967 births
Living people
Sportspeople from Derry (city)
Association footballers from Northern Ireland
Association football defenders
Nottingham Forest F.C. players
Manchester City F.C. players
Notts County F.C. players
Barnsley F.C. players
English Football League players
Northern Ireland international footballers